Kuenssberg is a surname of German origin. Notable people with the surname include:

Ekkehard von Kuenssberg (1913–2000), Scottish physician
Joanna Kuenssberg (born 1973), British diplomat
Laura Kuenssberg (born 1976), British journalist

Surnames of German origin